Chinga may refer to:

Places
 A political ward in the Othaya Constituency, Kenya.

People
 Chinga Chavin, American musical parodist

Other
 Chinga meteorite, an iron meteorite
 Chinga (The X-Files), an episode of the television series The X-Files
 Spanish profanity meaning fuck

See also
 Chingas District, a district in Peru.